Marshall Farnum (December 19, 1879 – February 19, 1917) was an American actor and film director. The youngest of the three Farnum boys, Dustin Farnum and William Farnum. Having directed first on stage, from 1913 he established himself as a film director at prominent companies such as Fox Film and World Film. He died of Tuberculosis at the age of thirty seven.

Selected filmography
 The Spoilers (1914, actor)
 Lady Audley's Secret (1915)
 Driftwood (1916)
 The House of Mirrors (1916)
 The Tides of Fate (1917)

References

Bibliography
 Roy Liebman. Broadway Actors in Films, 1894-2015. McFarland, 2017.

External links

portrait of Marshall Farnum in The Virginian, 1910 (Univ. of Washington, Sayre collection)
findagrave.com

1879 births
1917 deaths
American male stage actors
American film directors
People from Natick, Massachusetts
20th-century deaths from tuberculosis
Tuberculosis deaths in Arizona